Paul Ferdinand Willert (29 May 1844 – 1912) was an English author of several books and an Honorary Fellow of Exeter College, Oxford.

Life and career
After education at Eton, Willert matriculated at Balliol College, Oxford, on 20 October 1862. With the aid of a scholarship, he was a scholar of Corpus Christi College, Oxford, from 1864 to 1867, graduating B.A. in 1867. In 1867 he became a fellow of Exeter College, Oxford, graduating M.A. in 1869. At Exeter College, Willert was a fellow from 1867 to 1895, a classical lecturer in 1867 and again in 1881–1882, a dean in 1877 and again in 1884, and a tutor from 1877 to 1895. He was called to the bar at the Inner Temple in 1870. He was an assistant master at Eton from 1870 to 1874. At Exeter College he was made an honorary fellow in 1903.

Upon his death, Willert was survived by his wife, a son (Sir Arthur Willert), and a daughter. He was a close friend of J. L. Strachan-Davidson and Robert Bridges.

Selected publications

Articles

Books

References

1844 births
1912 deaths
Alumni of Corpus Christi College, Oxford
Alumni of Exeter College, Oxford
People educated at Eton College
English classical scholars
19th-century English writers
20th-century English writers
19th-century English male writers
20th-century English male writers
Fellows of Exeter College, Oxford